Jan Jesenský Jr. (1904–1942) was a scientist and collaborator of Professor Jan Jesenský at Prague Stomatologic Clinic, assistant professor at Prague University.

Jesenský was born in Prague. After the occupation of Czechoslovakia by Hitler, he became a member of a secret military resistance organisation. In 1942 he was arrested by the Gestapo and tortured to death in the Mauthausen concentration camp, Austria.

Jesenský was a cousin of Milena Jesenská.

See also
House of Jeszenszky

1904 births
1942 deaths
Czechoslovak civilians killed in World War II
People who died in Mauthausen concentration camp
Scientists from Prague
Czech scientists
People executed by torture
Czech people executed in Nazi concentration camps
Czech resistance members